Gerry Keegan (born 12 March 1994) is an Irish hurler who plays as a right corner-forward for the Kildare senior team.

Born in Celbridge, County Kildare, Keegan first arrived on the inter-county scene at the age of sixteen when he first linked up with the Kildare minor team, before later joining the under-21 side. Keegan made his senior debut in the 2012 Christy Ring Cup. Since then he has become a key member of the team and has won one Christy Ring Cup medal.

At club level Keegan is a two-time championship medallist with Celbridge.

Team

Celbridge
Kildare Senior Hurling Championship (3): 2011, 2013, 2018

Kildare
Christy Ring Cup (1): 2014
All-Ireland Under-21 B Hurling Championship: (1) 2014
Kehoe Cup (1): 2013

References

1994 births
Living people
Kildare inter-county hurlers
Celbridge hurlers